Sardar Charat Singh (1721–1770 or 1733—1774), also romanised as Charhat Singh, was the father of Mahan Singh, and the grandfather of Ranjit Singh. He distinguished himself at an early age in campaigns against Ahmad Shah Abdali and along with 150 horsemen split from the Singhpuria Misl to establish the Sukerchakia Misl.

Early life
Charat Singh was born to Chaudhary Naudh Singh (died 1752) and Lali Kaur in a Jat family. His grandfather was Budh Singh (died 1718), a disciple of Guru Gobind Singh. In 1756 he married Desan Kaur Waraich, a daughter of Sikh ruler Amir Singh Waraich. The couple had four children, two sons, Maha Singh and Suhej Singh followed by two daughters, Bibi Raj Kaur (not to be confused with the wife of Mahan Singh) and Saher Kaur.

He married the daughter of Jat Sikh ruler Amir Singh Waraich of Gujranwala, an older but still powerful sardar, and moved his headquarters there.

Charat Singh's Matrimonial Alliances 

"Charat Singh strengthened his position by matrimonial alliances.
 Charat's Singh's son Mahan Singh was married to the daughter of Jai Singh Mann of Mogalchak-Mananwala.
 Dal Singh Kalianwala of Alipur renamed Akālgarh was married to the sister of Charat Singh.
 Sohel Singh Bhangi was married to the daughter of Charat Singh.
 Sahib Singh Bhangi, son of Gujar Singh, was married to another daughter, Raj Kaur.
To establish a prominent place for himself among the Sikhs Charat Singh built a fort at Amritsar to the north of the city."  – Hari Ram Gupta

Military campaigns

In 1761, After the Third Battle of Panipat, Ahmad Shah Durrani sent his general Nur-ud-din to punish the Sikhs. He crossed the  river Jhelum in August 1761 at Khushab and marched up the left bank of the river, He destroyed three largest towns of the Doab, Bhera, Miani and Chak Sanu, The first two towns rose from the ruins afterwards, while the third remained deserted. Charat Singh along with other Sikh re checked his advance on the eastern bank of river Chenab. Afghans, 12,000 in number, fled away to Sialkot, which was immediately invested by Charat Singh, Nur-ud-din escaped on the eighth day to Jammu in the disguise of a beggar. His troops surrendered, but were allowed to go in safety. This success made Charat Singh a front rank leader among the Sikh sardars. He also seized some guns and other arms. When all was over Charat Singh made triumph entry in his capital Gujranwala

Charat Singh's victory over Nur-ud -din deeply perturbed Khwajah Abed Khan, the Durrani's governor of Lahore. He decided to check the growing power of Charat Singh. Besides he wanted to impress upon his master, the Durrani Emperor, that he was quite active in dis charging his duties. He invested Charat Singh's fort of Gujranwala in September, 1761. Charat Singh  continued fighting from inside the fort. The other Sikh sardars, Jassa Singh Ahluwalia, Bhangi chiefs Hari Singh, Jhanda Singh Dhillon, Lahna Singh and Gujar Singh, Jai Singh Kanhaiya, and Sobha Singh came for the relief of Charat Singh and encamped 6 kms away from Gujranwala. Khwajah Abed realized that he would be besieged and would soon be in the jaws of a nutcracker. In the night he took to flight without striking a blow. A number of swivels, pieces of cannon, horses, camels, etc., fell into the hands of the Sikhs, when all was over, 

In the beginning of January, 1762, Ahmad Shah Durrani came to the Panjab to inflict a crushing defeat on the Sikhs like that of the Marathas in the previous year. In the Battle of Kup near Malerkotla. Ahmad Shah suddenly pounced upon the encamped Sikhs on February 5, 1762, and killed about 25,000 Sikhs. On this occasion Charat Singh played a dominant role in opposing the enemy and in raising the spirit of the Sikhs.

In January, 1764, the Sikhs decided to punish Jani Khan and Mani Khan of Morindah as they had surrendered Mata Gujri and Guru Gobind Singh's two youngest sons to Wazir Khan of Sarhind . On this occasion Charat Singh posted his troops on the road to Sarhind to check any troops coming from that direction, He fought in the battle of Sirhind against Zain Khan Sirhindi, but took no territory as he had his eyes on the north-west Panjab. Charat Singh took possession of parganahs of Gujranwala, Qila Didar Singh, Qila Mian Singh, Qila Sahib Singh covering the
northern half of Gujranwala tahsil.

In May 1767, Charat Singh and Gujjar Singh Bhangi marched upon Jhelum, Its Gakhar Chief fled away to the fort of Rohtas for shelter. Charat Singh entrusted Jhelum town to Dada Ram Singh 

Charat Singh defeated  Sarfaraz Khan the commandant of Ahmad Shah Durrani and captured Rohtas fort, Sarfaraz Khan invited assistance from Nawab Sarbuland Khan, the Governor of Kashmir, Sarbuland Khan arrived Panjab on the Indus  near Attock after the fall of Rohtas, Charat Singh was at this time busy in restoring peace  and order in the district of Rohtas On hearing of the approach of Sarbuland Khan he marched to oppose him Sarbuland Khan at the head of strong force of 12,000 soldiers but Charat Singh fearlessly attacked the Afghans killed many and pludendered  their baggage, the Afghans fled away and Sarbuland Khan was taken prisoner, He was confined in the Rohtas fort, The Nawab paid a ransom of two lakhs  of rupees and thus secured his release.After the conquest of Rohtas Charat Singh then subdued the rebellion chief's and zamindars of the neighborhood and seized the parganahs of Dhanni, Pothohar, Chakwal, Jalalpur, and sayyidpur, after which the whole district made submission to him,

Death
In 1774, he invaded Jammu with Jai Singh of the Kanheya Misl to aid the eldest son of Ranjit Deo, Brij Raj Deo, against his father. The Bhangi Misl joined the side of Ranjit Deo against him. During the preparations for battle a matchlock exploded and killed him. During a battle the next day Jandha Singh, the leader of the Bhangi Misl was killed and both Misls retreated from the fight.

Legacy 

A samadhi (Indic cenotaph tomb) of Charat Singh is believed by some to be located at Gujranwala, near the Sheranwala Bagh. Jains dispute this and claim the structure is a Jain temple built in memory of a Jain scholar named Acharya Vijayanand Suri, whose father served in the military of Maharaja Ranjit Singh as an official. This theory is further refuted by the Umdat-ut-Tawarikh, a chronicle on the reign of Ranjit Singh and his successors by Sohan Lal Suri, the court recorder of the Sikh Empire. The chronicle states that Ranjit Singh, after leaving a village named Halla, paid a visit to his grandfather's samadhi on 5 October 1838 located near a village named Jalal. It further states he made an ardas and a donation of 200 rupees. After the visit, he left for a village called Karala. Therefore, the samadhi of Charat Singh is located near a village named Jalal, not Gujranwala.

Battles fought by Charat Singh
 Battle of Lahore (1759)
 Battle of Eminabad (1761)
 Battle of Sialkot (1761)
 Battle of Gujranwala (1761).
 Sikh Occupation of Lahore.
Battle of Harnaulgarh (1762)
Battle of Pipli Sahib
 Battle of Sialkot (1763).
Battle of Sirhind (1764)
Battle of Rohtas (1764)
Battle of Rohtas (1767)

In popular culture
 In the 2010 historical TV series Maharaja Ranjit Singh telecasted on DD National, the character of Charat Singh is portrayed by Jaspal Singh Sehgal.

References

Bibliography 

Indian Sikhs
Sikh warriors
1774 deaths
Year of birth unknown